Álvaro Luiz Maior de Aquino (born 1 November 1977), known simply as Álvaro, is a Brazilian footballer who plays for Esporte Clube Democrata.

Mainly a central defender, he holds a Spanish passport due to the years he spent in the country, representing three clubs and amassing La Liga totals of 192 games and 15 goals over the course of seven seasons.

Club career
Born in Nilópolis, São Paulo, Álvaro played for several Brazilian teams in quick succession to start his career, including two spells with São Paulo FC. In 2000 he was signed by UD Las Palmas in Spain, going on to spend three seasons with the club, two of those in La Liga. While in the Canary Islands he was found guilty of forging a European Union passport, spending several months during the 2001–02 campaign on the sidelines.

In the 2003 off-season, Álvaro signed for Real Zaragoza where he spent another three years, rarely missing a game and winning the 2004 Copa del Rey, against Real Madrid (3–2 in Barcelona). He scored his first league goal for the Aragonese on 2 November 2003, helping to a 2–0 away win over RCD Espanyol.

In the middle of 2006, Álvaro joined Levante UD, which had just regained top flight status. He was expected to sign for Premier League team Newcastle United for a fee around £3 million before the January 2008 transfer window closed, but finally remained in Spain until the end of the season as the offer from the latter proved to be a hoax.

In June 2008, in the middle of a severe financial crisis at Levante and with the club also being relegated from the top level, Álvaro returned to Brazil and joined Sport Club Internacional. The following year, he signed a one-year deal with Clube de Regatas do Flamengo.

Club statistics

according to Flamengo's official website and Flaestatística

Honours
Zaragoza
Copa del Rey: 2003–04
Supercopa de España: 2004

Internacional
Copa Sudamericana: 2008
Campeonato Gaúcho: 2009

Flamengo
Campeonato Brasileiro Série A: 2009

References

External links

Football-Lineups profile

1977 births
Living people
People from Nilópolis
Brazilian emigrants to Spain
Naturalised citizens of Spain
Brazilian footballers
Association football defenders
Campeonato Brasileiro Série A players
Campeonato Brasileiro Série B players
São Paulo FC players
América Futebol Clube (MG) players
Goiás Esporte Clube players
Clube Atlético Mineiro players
Sport Club Internacional players
CR Flamengo footballers
Vila Nova Futebol Clube players
Clube Atlético Bragantino players
Mogi Mirim Esporte Clube players
Clube Atlético Linense players
Esporte Clube Democrata players
La Liga players
Segunda División players
UD Las Palmas players
Real Zaragoza players
Levante UD footballers
Brazil under-20 international footballers
Brazilian expatriate footballers
Expatriate footballers in Spain
Brazilian expatriate sportspeople in Spain
Sportspeople from Rio de Janeiro (state)